Luke Antony Newman Treadaway (born 10 September 1984) is a British actor and singer. He won an Olivier Award for Best Leading Actor for his performance as Christopher in the National Theatre's production of The Curious Incident of the Dog in the Night-Time in 2013. He has also been nominated for an Evening Standard Theatre Award.

Early life
Born at the Royal Devon and Exeter Hospital in Exeter, Treadaway was brought up in Sandford, Devon. His father is an architect and his mother a primary school teacher; he has two brothers, older brother Sam Treadaway who is an artist and curator  and a slightly younger twin, actor Harry. His first acting role was in the village Christmas pantomime Little Red Riding Hood, that of a daffodil while his father was the Big Bad Wolf. Luke and Harry attended Queen Elizabeth's Community College in Crediton, where he played scrum half in the twice Devon-Cup-winning rugby union team.

Inspired by a love of Eddie Vedder and with support from their secondary school drama teacher, Phil Gasson, the twins formed a band called Lizardsun with Matt Conyngham and Seth Campbell. They also both joined the National Youth Theatre, for whom Luke played Prince Ivan in The Firebird. He was also in the ensemble for a production of Murder in the Cathedral.

Career
While still at drama school he and his twin brother recorded roles in their first feature film, Brothers of the Head, in which they played conjoined twins. Luke played Barry Howe, the band's singer, and his brother Harry played Tom Howe, the guitarist and songwriter. During rehearsals and throughout the shoot Luke and Harry were connected to each other for fifteen hours a day, wearing sewn-together wet suits or a harness. They also slept in one bed to simulate the conjoined nature of their characters. The Treadaways performed all tracks featured in the film themselves live on stage as well as recording nine tracks for the soundtrack album.

After graduating from the London Academy of Music and Dramatic Art in 2006 he played a series lead in The Innocence Project for BBC television. He also appeared as a 14-year-old Theo in the hard-hitting Channel 4 drama Clapham Junction.

He made his stage debut in Saint Joan at the Royal National Theatre, followed by playing Albert in the original production of War Horse at the same venue. In 2008 he appeared in Piranha Heights, a new play by Philip Ridley, at the Soho Theatre, and in Cradle Me, a new play by Simon Vinnicombe, at the Finborough Theatre. He also played Albert in John Tams' adaptation of War Horse for BBC Radio 2 on 8 November 2008.

In 2009 he appeared in the play Over There at the Royal Court Theatre alongside his twin brother from 25 February to 21 March. He spent November 2009 in Romania filming The Whistleblower with Rachel Weisz, Vanessa Redgrave and Monica Bellucci.

He played Prokopion in the 2010 film Clash of the Titans. He played Lee in Philip Ridley's Heartless, also starring Jim Sturgess and Noel Clarke, released in May 2010. He appeared in Killing Bono, starring Ben Barnes and Pete Postlethwaite. He also had a leading role in the independent Scottish film You Instead, which was filmed at T in the Park 2010.

In 2011 he played the eponymous hero of The History of Titus Groan, a cycle of six BBC Radio 4 dramas based on the books of Mervyn Peake dramatised by Brian Sibley. He also filmed Late Bloomers with William Hurt and Isabella Rossellini. He also starred in Attack the Block, a Film Four production, alongside John Boyega, Nick Frost and Jodie Whittaker. He also directed a music video for girl band Boxettes, whose lead singer Bellatrix comes from Sandford.

In 2012 Treadway starred in Cheerful Weather for the Wedding, the ITV adaptation of the Ruth Rendell thriller Thirteen Steps Down, and the National Theatre's acclaimed adaptation of Mark Haddon's novel The Curious Incident of the Dog in the Night-Time. On 28 April 2013 Treadaway won the Laurence Olivier Award for best actor for his performance in The Curious Incident of the Dog in the Night-Time, which by winning seven Oliviers equalled Matilda the Musical's record win in 2012.
Starred in Horror Thriller Fortitude between 2015-2018

In April 2018 Luke played the part of Dr Arthur Calgary in a BBC One three-part adaptation of the Agatha Christie novel Ordeal by Innocence.

Filmography

Film

Music video

Television

Theatre

Awards and nominations

References

External links

1984 births
Living people
British identical twins
People from Mid Devon District
English twins
Identical twin male actors
National Youth Theatre members
Alumni of the London Academy of Music and Dramatic Art
Male actors from Devon
English male film actors
English male radio actors
English male stage actors
English male television actors
English male voice actors
21st-century English male actors
Laurence Olivier Award winners